Tourcoing station (French: Gare de Tourcoing) is a railway station serving the town Tourcoing, Nord department, northern France.

Services

The station is served by high speed trains to Paris and regional trains to Roubaix and Lille.

SNCB/NMBS Belgian Railways trains also run from here to: Courtrai/Kortrijk for example on Belgian railway line 75.

References

Railway stations in Nord (French department)
Railway stations in France opened in 1905
Gare de Tourcoing